The Silver Bay Association Complex, known as Silver Bay YMCA Conference and Family Retreat Center, has been in operation since 1902. The YMCA campus is located in the hamlet of Silver Bay, New York, United States. It began as a farmhouse, and in the 1890s it was expanded and became a lodge capable of supporting 80 to 100 people. In 1897, Silas Paine, a Standard Oil executive, vacationed at the resort and decided to buy a portion of land adjacent to the property. In 1898, Silas had a large resort addition linked to the original house, and between 1900 and 1901 he added several cottages to the complex. The structure was bought by the YMCA in 1904, and assumed its final, well-preserved form during expansions between 1925 and 1926 under the supervision of architect William E. Clark (1882–1935). The complex was listed on the National Register of Historic Places on March 20, 1980. Architecturally, the Inn at Silver Bay is described as being in the Queen Anne style.

References

External links
 Silver Bay YMCA - Conference & Family Retreat Center

Hotel buildings completed in 1926
Hotel buildings on the National Register of Historic Places in New York (state)
Queen Anne architecture in New York (state)
Buildings and structures in Warren County, New York
National Register of Historic Places in Warren County, New York
NXIVM